The Bemis Bag Company Building is a historic building located in downtown Omaha, Nebraska. Built in 1887 in a commercial style, the building was designed by the prolific Omaha architecture firm of Mendelssohn and Lawrie. It was designated an Omaha Landmark on September 12, 1978, and was added to the National Register of Historic Places on January 11, 1985. In addition to its own listing on the NRHP, the Building is also included in the Warehouses in Omaha Multiple Property Submission.

The Bemis Company was a national leader in the manufacturing and sale of bags and sacks for flour, grain, and other commodities. It had warehouses and manufacturing facilities in several cities across the United States. This building cost about $40,000 to build.

See also
 Bemis Center for Contemporary Arts
 Bemis Park Landmark Heritage District

References

External links
 Bemis Bag Company Building at the Trans-Mississippi Exposition of 1898.
 History of the Bemis Company in a timeline and summary format, with period photos including one of the Omaha building.

National Register of Historic Places in Omaha, Nebraska
Omaha Landmarks
Commercial buildings on the National Register of Historic Places in Nebraska
Warehouses on the National Register of Historic Places
Commercial buildings completed in 1887
Packaging industry
Omaha Bag Company Building